Humpty Dumpty in Oakland is a realist, non-science fiction novel authored by Philip K. Dick. Originally completed in 1960, but rejected by prior publishers, this work was posthumously published by Gollancz in the United Kingdom in 1986. An American edition was published by Tor Books in 2007.

Plot summary
In 1960, 58-year-old Jim Fergesson decides to sell his Oakland-based auto repair business and retire. This threatens to greatly inconvenience his business tenant, used car salesman Al Miller, who rents a lot from Fergesson to sell his battered but superficially reconditioned old jalopies. Chris Harmon, an entrepreneur, advises Fergesson to invest in a new super-garage located in Marin Country Gardens. Jim takes a fall in the mud and has a minor heart attack during a visit to the property to personally verify its existence. Miller is convinced that Harmon is corrupt and makes an amateurish attempt at blackmailing him over his alleged (then-illegal) sale of salacious audio recordings. At the same time Al enters employment with Harmon as a curiously unqualified salesman of Classical Music. This, as it turns out, was an innocent administrative error. Al's actual assignment now involves the mass marketing of Barbershop Music. He sees conspiracies, machinations and double-dealings where there are none and strives mightily, but ultimately fails, to disrupt the final contract-signing between Fergesson and Harmon by playing on old Jim's paranoia. The strain of it all takes its toll on a recently injured, weakened, ailing Fergesson and he dies later that night at home.

Al then discovers that his used car lot has been ferociously vandalised, although the exact time and date remain uncertain. This plays an unexpectedly important role in the unfolding of subsequent events. Things are not quite what they seem, and coincidence plays a starring role here. His wife Julie quits her job and they run off together across Nevada, whilst Lydia, Jim's widow, discovers that her late husband's deal with Harmon was, contrary to what Al had sincerely believed, completely legitimate. Al is temporarily detained after Lydia threatens to sue him for fraud. Julie leaves him forever. In a moment of true serendipity Al starts a new relationship with his married real estate vendor, a vivacious, attractive "colored" woman by the name of Mrs. Lane.

References

Andrew Butler: The Pocket Essential Philip K.Dick: Harpenden: Pocket Essentials: 2007:

External links

Novels by Philip K. Dick
Novels set in Oakland, California
1960 American novels
Victor Gollancz Ltd books